KXGN (1400 kHz) is an AM radio station in Glendive, Montana, United States. The station is owned by Glendive Broadcasting, owner of KXGN-TV and KDZN and a subsidiary of The Marks Group. KXGN signed on in 1948.

Programming
KXGN broadcasts a mix of oldies and adult contemporary music with local news from KXGN and national news from ABC. Ranch, farm and other agriculture-oriented news is also offered on KXGN, as Glendive is a large farming community.

High School sports including Dawson County High School football, boys and girls basketball, volleyball and softball are heard on KXGN. The station also airs local American Legion, Babe Ruth and Little League baseball games in the summer. KXGN also airs games featuring the teams from Dawson Community College in Glendive and football and basketball games from the University of Montana in Missoula.

References

External links
KXGN AM Online

XGN
Dawson County, Montana
Mainstream adult contemporary radio stations in the United States
Oldies radio stations in the United States
Radio stations established in 1948
1948 establishments in Montana